Minnesota State Highway 40 (MN 40) is a  state highway in west-central Minnesota, which travels from  South Dakota Highway 20 (SD 20) at the South Dakota state line near Marietta and continues east to its eastern terminus at its intersection with County State-Aid Highway 5 (CSAH 5) in Willmar.

Route description
MN 40 serves as an east–west route between Madison and Willmar in west-central Minnesota.

The route is also known as:

1st Street in Madison
Lac qui Parle Avenue in Milan
60th Street throughout Chippewa County

MN 40 crosses Lac qui Parle Lake west of Milan.

The park entrance is located on CSAH 13 near US 59 at Watson.

MN 40 parallels US 12 and US 212 throughout its route in west-central Minnesota.

History
Most of MN 40 was authorized in 1933.

The section of the route between US 75 at Madison and the South Dakota state line was authorized c. 1950.

MN 40 was still gravel in 1940. The route was mostly paved by 1953, except for just west of Willmar. MN 40 was completely paved by 1958.

In 2009, its eastern terminus was moved from US 12 in Willmar to CSAH 5 (30th Street SW).

Major intersections

References

040
Transportation in Lac qui Parle County, Minnesota
Transportation in Chippewa County, Minnesota
Transportation in Kandiyohi County, Minnesota